United States Naval Station Tutuila was a naval station in Pago Pago Harbor on the island of Tutuila, part of American Samoa, built in 1899 and in operation until 1951. During the United States Navy rule of American Samoa, from 1900 to 1951, it was customary for the commandant of the station to also serve as Military Governor of the territory. Benjamin Franklin Tilley was the first commandant and the first officer responsible for the naval station's construction.

History
Located in the South Pacific, midway between Hawaii and New Zealand, the site was chosen in 1872 by Commander Richard Worsam Meade, who negotiated facilities for a coaling station for the United States Navy from the Samoan high chief Mauga Manuma.

Initially used by Pacific and Asiatic Squadrons, by 1940 Tutuila was a minor naval station. However, with the looming threat of a Pacific War, plans were drawn up for the development of its capabilities. In November 1940 expansion of the naval station began. After the attack on Pearl Harbor in December 1941 naval activity at Tutuila increased. Ship arrivals jumped from three in December 1941 to 56 in December 1942. Shipping activity was intensive throughout 1943. In March 1943, 121 vessels passed through Pago Pago harbor.  However, as the war moved north and west, Tutuila became a strategic backwater. Shipping arrivals declined after February 1944, from fifty per month to less than twenty. Naval Station Tutuila supported the near by Naval Base Upolu, the two bases had the US Navy code name Operation Straw.   

On January 11, 1942, a Japanese submarine surfaced off the coast of Tutuila and fired fifteen shells from its deck gun at the Naval Station in about ten minutes. Most landed harmlessly in the bay, but Commander Edwin Robinson was wounded in the knee by shrapnel and a member of the Fita Fita Guard (Samoan Marine Reserve) received minor injuries. Ironically, the only building damaged by the submarine's shell fire was a store owned by a Japanese expatriate, Frank Shimasaki. The fire was not returned in the only Japanese attack on Samoa during World War II.

Post-war Tutuila's military importance continued to decline, and in 1951, control of American Samoa was transferred from the Navy to the Department of the Interior. The harbor has since returned to commercial use.

U.S. Naval Station Historic District 

The Naval Station had over a hundred buildings at the height of its activity. Today, visitors may walk a 2-mile tour of the villages of Fagatogo and Utulei to visit some of the station's remaining structures. This trail goes by The Fono, the Old Bake Shop, Old Samoan Jail, Commissary Store (now Jean P. Haydon Museum), the Governor's House, and the Fagatogo Malae.

Sixteen buildings in the former Naval Station are listed on the National Register of Historic Places, one of which—Government House—is a National Historic Landmark.

See also
 
 List of governors of American Samoa
 National Register of Historic Places listings in American Samoa
 Naval Base Samoa

References

External links
 American Samoa Military Bases website

Military in American Samoa
Buildings and structures in American Samoa
Naval Stations of the United States Navy
Pago Pago
National Historic Landmarks in American Samoa
Tutuila
19th century in Samoa
20th century in American Samoa
1872 establishments in Oceania
1951 disestablishments in Oceania
Military installations established in 1872
Military installations closed in 1951
Closed installations of the United States Navy